Michael K. Colyar (born February 9, 1957) is an American actor, comedian, entertainer, voiceover artist, television/radio personality, and author.

Early life and education
Born in Chicago, Illinois, Colyar was raised in the Robert Taylor Homes public housing project and later relocated to the Morgan Park area. Colyar attended Morgan Park High School, graduating in 1975. Shortly after high school, Colyar attended Olive-Harvey junior college and later Chicago State University.

Other information
Colyar is the author of A Funny Thing Happened on the Way to The White House, I Knocked on the Door and a Brother Answered, which was published in August 2012. Colyar began embarking on his 100 City tour of "Michael Colyar's Momma" in June 2018. He has a starring role in the upcoming film "You Married Dat" alongside LisaRaye, Juhahn Jones, Apryl Jones, and Audra Kinkead.

Filmography

Film

Television

References

External links

 
 

American male comedians
Living people
1957 births
Chicago State University alumni
American male film actors
American stand-up comedians
American male voice actors
Male actors from Chicago
African-American male actors
American male television actors
20th-century American comedians
21st-century American comedians
African-American male comedians
People from Chicago
20th-century African-American people
21st-century African-American people